Orest B. "The Big O" Meleschuk (born April 11, 1940) is a Canadian former curler of Ukrainian descent.  He was one of Manitoba's best curlers during the 1960s and 1970s and has won a number of championships and major bonspiels.  His greatest curling triumph came in 1972 when he won the Manitoba, Canadian and World Championships of curling.

Meleschuk married Patrica Frances McSherry and they have two children, Sean and Karin.

Meleschuk was involved in the first Battle of the Sexes curling match, in which he lost to Vera Pezer's team.

Meleschuk currently lives in Selkirk, Manitoba.

See also
Curse of LaBonte

References
General
 Ukrainian Canadian, Eh?, Michael Czuboka, page 163, 1983, Communigraphics, Winnipeg, Manitoba.
Specific

External links
 

1940 births
Living people
Canadian people of Ukrainian descent
Curlers from Winnipeg
World curling champions
Brier champions
People from Saint Boniface, Winnipeg
Sportspeople from Selkirk, Manitoba